Tracey McLauchlan (born 18 August 1979 in Oxford) is a table tennis player for New Zealand. At the 2002 Commonwealth Games she won a bronze medal in the women's team event. In 1996 she was awarded the Junior Player of the Year by Table Tennis New Zealand.

References

1979 births
New Zealand female table tennis players
Commonwealth Games bronze medallists for New Zealand
People from Oxford, New Zealand
Living people
Commonwealth Games medallists in table tennis
Table tennis players at the 2002 Commonwealth Games
Sportspeople from Canterbury, New Zealand
Medallists at the 2002 Commonwealth Games